Arlindo Veiga dos Santos (February 12, 1902 – 1978) was a Brazilian intellectual, poet, writer and politician. He was the founder of the Brazilian Patrianovist Imperial Action (AIPB) and Black Brazilian Front (FNB) and one of the most important leader of both groups.

References 

1902 births
1979 deaths
People from Itu, São Paulo
Brazilian male poets
20th-century Brazilian poets
Brazilian Black Front politicians
Patrianovists
Brazilian fascists